Reza Moradi Ghiasabadi (born 1964) is an Iranian archaeoastronomer and post-colonial archaeological researcher. He is the author of Irania Encyclopedia, "The Sun in Tetrapylon" and other books.

Reza Moradi Ghiasabadi is a well-known Iranian researcher with a novel insight into History and Archaeology. He research projects explaining on the functionality of the Persian tetrapylons as solar structures. Some experts have confirmed this theory, and many shreds of evidence, validating it, has been found.

The book (The Sun in Tetrapylons) mentions to the terms of Mithra and Zurvan. For non-Persian-speaking readers, these two terms are defined here.

Zurvan (also: Zarvan) in the Avestan language (one of the old Iranian languages) means time. Afterwards, this term became a name for the great god who is the creator of the universe. Saturn was referenced as the embodiment of Zurvan. The Saturn's Greek name Cronus or Kronos is also associated with the time and its concept.

Ghiasabadi believes that the original concept of Mithra refers to the ecliptic pole, Pole Star, and consequently to the eternal light; however, the eternal light became equivalent to the sun as the great god and the creator. Mithra was the great god of Mithraism which was common in Persia and Roman about two thousand years ago. Beliefs and customs in Mithraism had crucial influences on Christianity such as using the red color, Cedrus, and star as sacred signs; celebrating Christmas which coincides with the winter solstice and the new year; and becoming the shape of the cross (which results from rotating constellations of Ursa Major and Ursa Minor known as the Chariot of Mithra) as the Cross of Jesus.

References

External links
Persian Studies
Ancient board-games and a compass-rose unearthed in Iran
A rock in Kaftarlou hill in Kurdistan province

Archaeoastronomers
Iranian Iranologists
Postcolonial literature
1964 births
Living people